Mario Bonello (born 28 January 1974) is a retired Maltese athlete who specialised in the sprinting events. He represented his country at two Olympic Games, in 1996 and 2000, as well as two outdoor and one indoor World Championships. In addition, he won multiple medals at the Games of the Small States of Europe.

Competition record

Personal bests
Outdoor
100 metres – 10.64 (+0.1 m/s) (Marsa 2000)
200 metres – 21.46 (+0.9 m/s) (Rieti 2003)
400 metres – 48.78 (Avezzano 2003)
Indoor
60 metres – 6.90 (Valencia 1998)
200 metres – 22.30 (Valencia 1998) NR

References

External links
 

1974 births
Living people
Maltese male sprinters
Athletes (track and field) at the 1996 Summer Olympics
Athletes (track and field) at the 2000 Summer Olympics
Olympic athletes of Malta
Athletes (track and field) at the 2001 Mediterranean Games
Athletes (track and field) at the 2005 Mediterranean Games
Mediterranean Games competitors for Malta